Undefeated or The Undefeated may refer to:

Film 
 The Undefeated (1969 film), an American Western starring John Wayne, Rock Hudson
 The Undefeated (2000 film), a Ukrainian film
 Undefeated (2003 film), an American television movie starring John Leguizamo
 Undefeated (2011 film), an American sports documentary about a high school football team
 The Undefeated (2011 film), an American political documentary about Sarah Palin

Literature 
"The Undefeated" (short story), a 1927 story by Ernest Hemingway
The Undefeated, a memoir by George Paloczi-Horvath
The Undefeated, a 1957 novel by I. A. R. Wylie, set in France during and after the Second World War
The Undefeated (novella), a 1996 novella by Irvine Welsh
The Undefeated (picture book), 2019 picture book by Kwame Alexander, illustrated by Kadir Nelson

Music 
 Undefeated (album), by Bobby Bare Jr., 2014
 Undefeated, an album by Secondhand Serenade, 2014
 "Undefeated" (Def Leppard song), 2011
 "Undefeated" (Jason Derulo song), 2012
 "Undefeated", a song by Audio Adrenaline from Until My Heart Caves In, 2005
 "Undefeated", a song by a Boogie wit da Hoodie from The Bigger Artist, 2017
 "Undefeated", a song by Incubus from 8, 2017
 "Undefeated", a song by KSI from Dissimulation, 2020

Sports 
 Perfect season, a sports season in which a team remains undefeated and untied
 Floyd Mayweather vs. Ricky Hatton or Undefeated, a 2007 boxing match
 The Undefeated (website), now called Andscape, an ESPN-owned website focusing on issues of race in sports

Clothing 
 Undefeated, Clothing Brand Established in 2002